Dhir Muni Lal (11 January 1913 – 8 January 1990) was an Indian diplomat and first class cricketer.

Lal was a right-handed opening batsman and played his cricket with both Southern Punjab and Northern India. He played a two-day match against M.C.C. in 1933-34 and his last first class match was against West Indies in 1948-49. Lal also played for the Punjab University, Lahore. He made five first-class half centuries, with his highest score of 90 made in the 1937-38 Ranji Trophy. Outside the playing field, he was the editor of Crickinia, an early Indian cricket annual. His son Akash Lal was a first class cricketer, cricket administrator and commentator while his nephew Arun Lal played Test cricket for India.

Muni Lal had a distinguished academic and diplomatic career. He completed M.Phil. in University of the Punjab in 1935. He worked for the Civil and Military Gazette till 1947. After the partition of India, he joined the Indian Foreign Service. He served in Pakistan, Australia, United States, Indonesia and the United Kingdom. He was the High commissioner to West Indies and ambassador to Somalia. In his last first class match, Lal had scored 0 and 4, dismissed in both innings by Gerry Gomez. When he moved to Trinidad as the high commissioner, Gomez was one of the first people who he met there.

During a burglary at his home in 1990, Lal and his wife were murdered by the intruders.

See also
List of cricketers who were murdered

References

External links

1913 births
1990 deaths
Indian cricketers
Northern India cricketers
Southern Punjab cricketers
Hindus cricketers
North Zone cricketers
Male murder victims
Indian murder victims
People murdered in India